Noisia (stylised as NOISIΛ; "VISION" turned upside down) was a Dutch electronic music trio consisting of members Nik Roos, Martijn van Sonderen and Thijs de Vlieger from Groningen, Netherlands. They produce a wide variety of music including drum and bass, dubstep, breakbeat and house. They have released music under several labels including Skrillex's Owsla, deadmau5's mau5trap and Jay-Z's Roc Nation. Noisia previously combined with the group Foreign Beggars to form the supergroup side project I Am Legion. They released their collaborative self-titled album on 2 September 2013. Noisia also have production credits under the pseudonym Nightwatch, such as for their work with Alexis Jordan, Hadouken!, Wiley and Wretch 32. They produced Hadouken!'s album For the Masses that charted at number 19 on the UK Albums Chart.

Noisia have also produced numerous works for video games, notably a soundtrack for DmC: Devil May Cry, a Counter-Strike: Global Offensive Music Kit in 2014, and an original game soundtrack for the 2.5D multiplayer game Armajet.

Career

2003–06: Record deals and formation
After a few collaborations with Martijn, who had been involved in music (hip hop production/classical piano) for quite a while before he joined Nik and Thijs, Martijn was added to the Noisia team. The first Noisia song that received interest from a label (Mayhem's Shadow Law Recordings) was found on a production message board. February 2003 saw the birth of the recording that was going to be the first Noisia release: "Tomahawk" by Noisia & Mayhem on Paul Reset's Nerve Recordings imprint. "Silicon" / "Tomahawk" was released in August 2003. For a time between 2005 and 2009, Noisia also released tracks as Drifter, encompassing liquid funk, as well as releasing an EP under the name Hustle Athletics on Love Break Recordings. They later decided to go back to releasing all their music under the name Noisia so as to not confuse the audience and to avoid being pigeonholed into different genres with different names.

Noisia have released music on major drum & bass labels such as Teebee's Subtitles, Goldie's Metalheadz, Rob Playford's Moving Shadow, RAM Records, Virus Recordings, Hospital Records, and Renegade Hardware. The Dutch collective has also received extensive airplay on BBC Radio 1. Eventually, Robbie Williams showed interest in working with Noisia, asking them to remix his cover of Manu Chao's "Bongo Bong and Je ne t'aime plus", which they turned into a house track released on the major record label EMI. The Noisia remix of Moby's "Alice" has also been released to critical acclaim.

2007–09: Commercial breakthrough and productions
Early 2007 saw the release of Tasha Baxter's Colour of Me, an album entirely produced by Noisia. They met Baxter and bandmate Andre Scheepers on the internet, and the two-member band was signed to EMI South Africa. It took more than a year to complete the project, the end product being a pop-oriented album influenced by reggae and drum and bass. In June 2008, they released FabricLive.40, a mix CD on the Fabric label that includes many of their own tracks. Noisia completed a remix of "Omen" for The Prodigy to accompany its release in February 2009. In mid-2009, Noisia produced Hadouken!'s second album For the Masses, released in 2010 which entered the UK Albums Chart at number 19. They have also officially remixed Skrillex's "Scary Monsters and Nice Sprites", as well as deadmau5's "Raise Your Weapon".

2010–15: Split the Atom and other ventures

Noisia's debut studio album Split the Atom was released on 5 April 2010. The first single from the album, "Machine Gun", was released on 8 March 2010. The second single from the album, "Split the Atom", was released on 25 July 2010. On 27 February 2012, Noisia released a special edition of their album Split the Atom on deadmau5's acclaimed label mau5trap, alongside 2012 remixes from the likes of Munchi, Kill the Noise and Loadstar. In later 2012, Noisia also remixed Mark Knight's track, "Nothing Matters", and also "Smack My Bitch Up" for The Prodigy for the re-release of The Fat of the Land.

Noisia have also written music for short films as well as various video games, including Midnight Club 3: Dub Edition, Wipeout Pulse, Wipeout HD, and Wipeout HD Fury. They also produced "The Tide", which was featured on Dance Dance Revolution Universe 2 and "Stigma" was used in the intro of Gran Turismo PSP. Their song "Groundhog" was featured twice in DJ Hero, first as a mashup with Motörhead's "Ace of Spades '08" then later as a beat juggle by the Scratch Perverts. A remixed version of "Groundhog" can also be found in the soundtrack of MotorStorm: Pacific Rift. The group also collaborated with Klaus Badelt to provide a series of remixes for the MotorStorm: Apocalypse soundtrack. The 16bit remix of "Machine Gun" was featured in the "Stranded" Trailer for the video game Far Cry 3, and "Could This Be" and "Machine Gun" were used on SSX. Noisia worked alongside Ninja Theory and produced over three hours' worth of music for them and their DmC: Devil May Cry reboot; the 36-track soundtrack was released through Division on 15 January 2013.

Noisia curate two record labels: Vision Recordings is intended for their drum and bass work, including collaborations with other producers in the genre, such as Teebee, Mayhem, or MC Verse. Vision's sister label Division Recordings is an outlet for their output in other genres such as house and grime. Invisible Recordings was launched in March 2010 focusing on experimental drum and bass, and was closed in 2019.

I Am Legion

I Am Legion is a supergroup formed by Noisia and the British hip hop group Foreign Beggars. They released their eponymous debut album I Am Legion on 2 September 2013, following the singles "Make Those Move" and "Choosing For You".

2015–2018: Outer Edges

On 10 June 2016, Noisia announced that the title of their second studio album was to be Outer Edges (2016), and released its lead single, "Anomaly", via digital retailers. On 30 June, "Collider" was released as the second single from the album, in the form of a promotional video. The same day, the album's track listing and pre-order were made available, and the release date announced as 16 September 2016. On the press release, the trio claim that the title was chosen because "all the songs are little islands that we take to their individual edge". The trio were notified that the album appeared online on 29 July 2016 just ten minutes before they premiered a brand new audio visual show at Let It Roll festival in Czech Republic. On 1 August 2016 official statement from the group was released that the album will be available on digital platforms on 5 August 2016. CD, vinyl and merchandise come out as originally planned in September same year.

2019–2022: Split and final album Closer

On 17 September 2019, Noisia confirmed they would be splitting at the end of 2020, citing creative differences. They expressed a desire to continue releasing music until the end of the year, along with a farewell tour, and that they hoped to continue to work together on occasion. The group later postponed and expanded their farewell tour into 2021, citing the COVID-19 pandemic. On 3 June 2020, they became a featured artist in the rhythm game osu!, meaning that some of their songs are now licensed and free to use in the game.

In the same year, the debut studio album Killjoy by Fox Stevenson, was released on 18 October 2019 with 11 out of 13 tracks were co-produced by Noisia (as Nightwatch) and Fox Stevenson himself.

New side projects and aliases from the members have begun releasing records since the announcement of the split; notably solo projects from both de Vlieger and Roos titled Thys and Sleepnet, respectively; and Body Ocean – a house duo consisting of Roos and The Upbeats' Jeremy Glenn. In 2020, de Vlieger acknowledged on Twitter his involvement in ILY – a duo consisting of himself and Skrillex. Although no original records have been released currently, the duo previously performed an impromptu DJ set at OOST in February 2020. On 26 November 2020, Bandai Namco Arts Channel on YouTube uploaded a video, "Obsolete - Opening Music Video", for their YouTube originals anime series, started airing on 3 December 2019. with music by Skrillex and Nik Roos (as Nightwatch).

On 28 April 2022, Noisia announced one final album called "Closer", which represents all the different directions they enjoyed exploring.  Also on August 21, 2022, they played together for the last time before splitting up definitely.

Awards

In 2015, Noisia won multiple awards at the Drum&BassArena Awards, including 'Best Producer', a collaboration with the Upbeats on 'Best Track' (Dead Limit) and 'Best Live Act'.

In 2016, Noisia again won multiple awards at the Drum&BassArena Awards, including 'Best Video' (Mantra), 'Best Album' (Outer Edges) and 'Best Producer'.

Discography

 Split the Atom (2010)
 I Am Legion (with Foreign Beggars) (2013)
 Outer Edges (2016)
 Closer (2022)

References

External links

Musical groups established in 2000
Breakbeat music groups
Drum and bass music groups
Dutch DJs
Dutch drum and bass musicians
Dutch electronic music groups
Dutch house music groups
Mau5trap artists
Moombahcore musicians
Musical groups from Groningen (city)
Record production trios
Roc Nation artists
21st-century Dutch musicians
Electronic dance music DJs